Helldorado is a 1934 American drama film directed by James Cruze and written by Philip Dunne, Frances Hyland, and Rex Taylor. The film stars Richard Arlen, Madge Evans, Ralph Bellamy, James Gleason, Helen Jerome Eddy and Henry B. Walthall. The film was released on December 21, 1934, by Fox Film Corporation.

Plot

Cast    
Richard Arlen as Art Ryan
Madge Evans as Glenda Wynant
Ralph Bellamy as J.F. Van Avery
James Gleason as Sam Barnes
Helen Jerome Eddy as Miss Fife
Henry B. Walthall as Abner Meadows 
Gertrude Short as Mae
Patricia Farr as Flo
Stanley Fields as truck driver
Philip Hurlic as Sam Ed
Stepin Fetchit as Ulysses
Lester Dorr as newspaper reporter

References

External links
 

1934 films
1930s English-language films
American drama films
1934 drama films
Fox Film films
Films directed by James Cruze
1930s American films